Thomas Paul Haffield (born 28 January 1988) was a Welsh competitive swimmer who was best known for his participating in individual medley events.  He has represented Great Britain in the Olympic Games, and Wales in the Commonwealth Games.  At the 2008 Summer Olympics in Beijing, he only competed in the preliminary heats of the 400-metre individual medley swimming event, finishing with the 17th-best time overall.

Personal bests and records held

External links
British Olympic Association athlete profile
British Swimming athlete profile

1988 births
Living people
Sportspeople from Neath
Welsh male swimmers
Olympic swimmers of Great Britain
Swimmers at the 2008 Summer Olympics
Swimmers at the 2010 Commonwealth Games
Commonwealth Games competitors for Wales